Primera División A (Méxican First A Division) 1994-95 is a Mexican football tournament. This was the first tournament played, the newly created league took over the Second division. 15 clubs played the tournament in order to earn promotion to the first division at the end of the tournament A. Celaya earn the Promotion and Tabasco was relegated to the Second Division.

Stadium and locations

Group league tables

Group 1

Group 2

Group 3

Group 4

General league table

Regular season

Liguilla

Repechaje

Group A

Group B

Final round

Semi-finals

(*) Atlético Celaya advanced thanks to having better results in the season

Final

Top scorers

2
Ascenso MX seasons
1994–95 domestic association football leagues